Protomachus was a Macedonian general in the Battle of Issus commanding the Prodromoi and replacing Amyntas (son of Arrhabaeus). In the battle of Gaugamela he was replaced by Aretes

References

Ancient Macedonian generals
Year of death unknown
Year of birth unknown